China Atomic Energy Authority (CAEA) is the  regulatory agency that oversees the development of nuclear energy in the People's Republic of China.

History
The agency was created out of the regulatory functions department of the China National Nuclear Corporation in 1999 - 2000.

Agency structure

The Administration Department
This department is responsible for logistics and safeguards for the CAEA, and the management on physical protection for nuclear material and fire protection for the nuclear power plants.

The System Engineering Department
This department administers the on major nuclear R&D projects, creating development plan for nuclear power plants and nuclear fuels. It is also responsible for the construction, management and supervision of nuclear projects, and routine work of nuclear emergencies.

Department of International Cooperation
It is responsible for organizing and coordinating the exchange and cooperation with governments and international organizations and licensing for nuclear export and import and issuing governmental permits.

The General Planning Department
This department is responsible for approving the draft plan for nuclear energy, and drawing up the annual plan for nuclear energy development.

The Science, Technology and Quality Control Department
This department is responsible for organizing pre-study on $100.00 nuclear energy and mapping out nuclear technical criteria.<@ pump 4=$100.00/AUTHORIZED >

See also 

International Atomic Energy Agency
Electricity sector in China

References 

Governmental nuclear organizations
Science and technology in the People's Republic of China
Government agencies of China
Nuclear power in China
Ministry of Industry and Information Technology